Alejandro Cruz may refer to:
 Alejandro Cruz Ortiz (1921–2007), Mexican luchador (professional wrestler) known as Black Shadow
 Alejandro Cruz (politician) (c. 1930–1993), Puerto Rican softball player and mayor of Guaynabo
 Alejandro Cruz (runner) (born 1968), Mexican marathoner
 Alejandro Jimenez Cruz (born 1972), Mexican luchador known as Dr. Cerebro